City Gallery Te Whare Toi is a public art gallery in Wellington, New Zealand.

History
City Gallery Te Whare Toi began its life as the Wellington City Art Gallery on 23 September 1980 in a former office block located at 65 Victoria Street, now the site of Wellington Central Library. The first exhibition was a group show of Wellington artists. In 1989, as work began on the new Wellington Library and Civic Centre, the gallery relocated to the other side of Victoria Street to occupy the old Chews Lane Post Office for four years until 1993 when it was rebranded as City Gallery and moved to its present location on the north-eastern side of Civic Square. Since 1995,  City Gallery has been managed on behalf of the Wellington City Council by the Wellington Museums Trust which now trades as Experience Wellington.

The current building 
City Gallery currently occupies the former Wellington Central Library building. Built in 1940 in an Art Deco style, this building replaced the original red brick City Library of 1893. When the Wellington Central Library relocated to its new Ian Athfield-designed building in 1991, the building underwent a major refurbishment so it could meet the needs of a contemporary art gallery. The Gallery’s window installation was installed in 1994. ‘Fault’ is by Bill Culbert and Ralph Hotere and consists of two strips of neon light cutting diagonally across the building. A significant addition built in 2008-2009 added two new galleries for emerging Wellington, Maori and Pacific art along with a 135-seat auditorium.

Directors 

The first Director was Seddon Bennington, who went on to be the second Chief Executive of Te Papa. He was followed in 1982 by Ann Philbin who described the challenge of the Gallery’s cramped quarters on Victoria Street, “When you work from a gallery that is not beautiful or grand—that does not even have a fridge or public toilets for functions—you have to sell your ideas.” Philbin was followed by John Leuthart in1985 who appointed the Gallery’s first curator Gregory Burke two years later. Paula Savage became Director in 1990 and oversaw the Gallery’s move to the current location and its rebranding as City Gallery. The rebranding cemented a long-term relationship with the advertising agency Saatchi & Saatchi resulting in a number of award winning ads. In 2009 Savage was responsible for one of the Gallery’s most popular exhibitions: Yayoi Kusama: Mirrored Years with an attendance of 88,155. The same year she appointed City Gallery’s first Curator of Māori and Pacific Art Reuben Friend. Elizabeth Caldwell followed Savage who left the Gallery in 2011 after twenty-two years as its director.

Exhibitions 
1982 Greer Twiss: a Survey 1959 – 1981 curated by the Director Seddon Bennington was the first major touring exhibition instituted by the Gallery.

1986 David Hockney: Hockney’s Photographs was the first of many popular international exhibitions and City Gallery’s first fee-paying show. To accommodate it, the Gallery was required to install air conditioning to meet international conservation standards. 

1986 Karanga Karanga was the first public art museum exhibition in New Zealand of collaborative works by wāhine artists. Listener reviewer Georgina Kamiria Kirby described it as, “An exhibition done by Māori women, about Māori women, for Māori women” 

1990 Now See Hear! Art, Language and Translation was the most ambitious exhibition attempted by City Gallery up to that time. Curated by Gregory Burke and Ian Wedde to mark 150 years since the signing of the Treaty of Waitangi,  it featured 236 New Zealand and international artists. 

1993 Rosemarie Trockel  was the first exhibition City Gallery toured outside New Zealand when it travelled to the MCA in Sydney. It was curated by Gregory Burke and opened City Gallery’s new building in Civic Square. Alongside the Rosemarie Trockel exhibition were four shows of women artists: Alter/Image, Te Whare Puanga, and Jacqueline Fraser’s project He Tohu: The New Zealand Room. Alter/Image surveyed twenty years of work by New Zealand women artists.

In 1998 City Gallery worked with the acclaimed Dutch curator Rudi Fuchs to present The Exhibition of the Century: Modern Masters from the Stedelijk Museum, Amsterdam which included artists ranging from Vincent van Gogh to Jeff Koons. In 2006 a major exhibition by Australian artist Patricia Piccinini attracted a record audience for the time of 120,000. 

Since opening at its current location in 1993, City Gallery has also hosted monographic exhibitions of many other major international artists including Tracey Emin, Keith Haring, Rosalie Gascoigne, Frida Kahlo and Diego Rivera, Tracey Moffatt, Sidney Nolan, Bridget Riley, Sam Taylor Wood, Salla Tykkä, Stanley Spencer, Wim Wenders as well as New Zealand's own Laurence Aberhart, Rita Angus, Shane Cotton, Tony Fomison, Bill Hammond, Ralph Hotere, Ronnie van Hout, Melvin Day, Martin Thompson, and Boyd Webb.

A full list of exhibitions, catalogues and relevant commentary is hosted on City Gallery’s Past Exhibitions page.

Controversies 
In 1995 a petition by the Christian Heritage Party collected 2829 signatures and an advertisement was placed in an unsuccessful but controversial attempt to close the Robert Mapplethorpe Retrospective exhibition at City Gallery. In March 1999, the same group tried to have the Keith Haring exhibition closed. They suggested that the police should photograph everybody visiting the exhibition, and complained that although the catalogue accompanying the exhibition was classed as unrestricted by the Office of Film and Literature Classification, the exhibition itself featured works of sodomy and bestiality that were not suitable for families. The party then submitted 18 works to the Office of Film and Literature Classification, but the case was not heard until after the exhibition closed. The censor classified five of the submitted works from the exhibition as "objectionable unless restricted to people over 13 or children accompanied by a parent or guardian". 

Early in 2021, Experience Wellington announced a restructuring process which included changes to the staffing of City Gallery, the disestablishment of the role of a dedicated director, and the removal of the senior curator Robert Leonard. The restructure proved controversial, and although questioned by the Mayor and opposed by senior members of the wider arts community, it was fully implemented and the role of Director disestablished.

References

External links
Wellington's Old Buildings, David Kernohoran, Victoria University Press 1994, page 184
 City Gallery Wellington
 Wellington Museums Trust

Buildings and structures in Wellington City
Gummer and Ford buildings and structures
Tourist attractions in Wellington City
Art museums and galleries in New Zealand
1940s architecture in New Zealand
Wellington Central, Wellington